Jack Miles is an author.

Jack Miles may also refer to:

Jack Miles (political activist) (1888–1969), Scottish-born Australian stonemason and communist leader
Jack Miles (rugby union) (1880–1953), English rugby union player

See also
John Miles (disambiguation)